Michael Keohane may refer to:

 Michael Keohane (racing driver) (born 1980), Irish racing driver
 Michael Keohane (athlete), Paralympic athlete from the United States

See also
 Keohane (disambiguation)